Posht-e Kuh (also Romanized as Posht-e Kūh, Posht Kooh, Posht Kūh, and Poshtkūh) is a village in Shamil Rural District, Takht District, Bandar Abbas County, Hormozgan Province, Iran. At the 2006 census, its population was 477, in 103 families.

References 

Populated places in Bandar Abbas County